Delano Hill (born 29 April 1975) is a Dutch former professional footballer who played as a centre-back. He worked as the assisting coach of FC Dordrecht.

Career
Born in Rotterdam, Hill made his debut in professional football, being part of the FC Den Bosch squad in the 1995–96 season. He also played for RKC Waalwijk, FC Hansa Rostock and Austria Wien before joining Willem II for the second time in his career.

In 2008, he joined Qatari side Al-Wakrah, before returning to the Netherlands in 2009, beginning as the assistant coach of FC Dordrecht.

References

External links
 

1975 births
Living people
Dutch footballers
Footballers from Rotterdam
Association football central defenders
Eredivisie players
Bundesliga players
Austrian Football Bundesliga players
FC Den Bosch players
RKC Waalwijk players
Willem II (football club) players
FC Hansa Rostock players
FK Austria Wien players
Al-Wakrah SC players
Haaglandia players
Dutch expatriate footballers
Dutch expatriate sportspeople in Germany
Expatriate footballers in Germany
Dutch expatriate sportspeople in Austria
Expatriate footballers in Austria
Dutch expatriate sportspeople in Qatar
Expatriate footballers in Qatar